"Je sais pas" is a French-language song by Canadian singer Celine Dion, recorded for her French album, D'eux (1995). It was released as a single on 2 October 1995 in Francophone countries and in December 1995 in selected European countries. In Canada it was a radio-only release in July 1995. The song topped the charts in France, Belgium, and Quebec. Dion also recorded it in English as "I Don't Know" and included it on her 1996 album, Falling into You.

Background and release
The narrator of the song boasts that she is unafraid to face any number of tribulations and challenges of the body and spirit, but admits life without the one she loves just might be more than she could bear. Dion has stated that this is one of her favorites among her songs, because it reminds her of her feelings for husband René Angélil.

"Je sais pas" was written and produced by Jean-Jacques Goldman and J. Kapler, with Goldman handling production duties.

Two music videos were made for this song: a non-singing version and a performance (singing) one, both of which were directed by Gregg Masuak in 1995. These music videos can be found on Dion's DVD On ne change pas (2005). Edited versions of the non-singing video were also used for "Next Plane Out" and "Call the Man" singles (none of them were released in France).

An English version of this song, called "I Don't Know" was featured on Falling into You.

Live version of "Je sais pas" from Live à Paris was also released as a single, on 19 May 1997 in the Netherlands to promote that album.

The song was featured on Dion's greatest hits compilation On ne change pas. The live version was a part of two other albums: Live à Paris and Au cœur du stade; the former was also released as a single on 19 May 1997 in the Netherlands to promote the live album.  Dion also performed it during the French concerts of her 2008-09 Taking Chances World Tour. The audio and footage of this performance was included in the French edition of Taking Chances World Tour: The Concert CD/DVD.  In 2013, the song was performed for the Sans attendre Tour; the Quebec performance was included in the Céline une seule fois / Live 2013 CD/DVD. Dion also performed "Je sais pas" during her French concerts of her Live 2017 tour.

"Je sais pas" was a smash hit in France, where it topped the singles chart for seven weeks, selling 506,000 copies (should be certified platinum but it remains undercertified with gold award). On the 1995s year-end lists, it was number six on sales and number ten on airplay. It was also number 1 in Belgium Wallonia (for two weeks) and Quebec (four weeks). "Je sais pas" was certified Gold in Belgium. The 1995 studio version peaked at number 34 in the Netherlands. The 1997 live version from Live à Paris reached number 78.

Formats and track listings

European 7", 12" and CD single
"Je sais pas" – 4:35
"La mémoire d'Abraham" – 3:51

European CD maxi-single
"Je sais pas" – 4:35
"La mémoire d'Abraham" – 3:51
"Je danse dans ma tête" (Live) – 4:27

1997 Dutch CD single
"Je sais pas" (Live) – 4:26
"J'attendais" – 4:24

1997 Dutch CD maxi-single
"Je sais pas" (Live) – 4:25
"J'attendais" (Live) – 4:58
"J'attendais" – 4:24

Charts

Weekly charts

Year-end charts

Decade-end charts

All-time charts

Certifications and sales

Release history

See also
French Top 100 singles of the 1990s
List of number-one singles of 1995 (France)
Ultratop 40 number-one hits of 1995

References

External links

1995 singles
1995 songs
1990s ballads
Celine Dion songs
French-language songs
Live singles
Pop ballads
SNEP Top Singles number-one singles
Songs written by Jean-Jacques Goldman
Songs written by Robert Goldman (songwriter)
Ultratop 50 Singles (Wallonia) number-one singles